Baye Kola or Baye Kala may refer to:
 Baye Kola, Neka
 Baye Kola, Savadkuh